Potnjani  is a village in Croatia. It is connected by the D515 highway.

Name
The name of the village in Croatian is plural.

Populated places in Osijek-Baranja County